The Roman Catholic Diocese of Lurín is a diocese located in the Lurín District in the Ecclesiastical province of Lima in Peru.

History
14 December 1996: Established as Diocese of Lurín from the Metropolitan Archdiocese of Lima

Bishops

Ordinaries
José Ramón Gurruchaga Ezama, S.D.B. (14 December 1996 – 17 June 2006)
Carlos García Camader (since 17 June 2006)

Auxiliary bishop
Salvador Piñeiro García-Calderón (2003-2006?), appointed Archbishop of Ayacucho o Huamanga in 2011

Other priest of this diocese who became bishop
Cristóbal Bernardo Mejía Corral, appointed Bishop of Chulucanas in 2020

See also
Roman Catholicism in Peru

Sources
 GCatholic.org
 Catholic Hierarchy

Roman Catholic dioceses in Peru
Roman Catholic Ecclesiastical Province of Lima
Christian organizations established in 1996
Roman Catholic dioceses and prelatures established in the 20th century
1996 establishments in Peru